Maaraba is a Syrian village in the Al-Tall District of the Rif Dimashq Governorate. According to the Syria Central Bureau of Statistics (CBS), Maaraba had a population of 10,290 in the 2004 census. Its inhabitants are predominantly Sunni Muslims.

As a result of the Syrian Civil War which meant huge refugee waves, the estimated population in 2018 was around 300,000.

References

Bibliography

Populated places in Al-Tall District